Rangpur-6 is a constituency represented in the Jatiya Sangsad (National Parliament) of Bangladesh since 2014 by Shirin Sharmin Chaudhury of the Awami League.

Boundaries 
The constituency encompasses Pirganj Upazila.

History 
The constituency was created for the first general elections in newly independent Bangladesh, held in 1973.

Members of Parliament

Elections

Elections in the 2010s 
Sheikh Hasina stood for two seats in the 2014 general election: Rangpur-6 and Gopalganj-3. After winning both, she chose to represent Gopalganj-3 and quit the other, triggering a by-election in Rangpur-6. Shirin Sharmin Chaudhury of the Awami League was elected unopposed in January 2014 after no one else filed to contest the by-election scheduled for February 2014.

Elections in the 2000s 
Sheikh Hasina stood for three seats in the 2008 general election: Bagerhat-1, Rangpur-6, and Gopalganj-3. After winning all three, she chose to represent Gopalganj-3 and quit the other two, triggering by-elections in them. Abul Kalam Azad of the Awami League was elected in an April 2009 by-election, defeating BNP candidate Nur Muhammad Mandal.

Elections in the 1990s 
Hussain Muhammad Ershad stood from jail for five seats in the June 1996 general election: Rangpur-2, Rangpur-3, Rangpur-5, Rangpur-6, and Kurigram-3. After winning all five, he chose to represent Rangpur-3 and quit the other four, triggering by-elections in them. Nur Mohammad Mondal of the Jatiya Party (Ershad) was elected in a September 1996 by-election.

Hussain Muhammad Ershad stood from jail for five seats in the 1991 general election: Rangpur-1, Rangpur-2, Rangpur-3, Rangpur-5, and Rangpur-6. After winning all five, he chose to represent Rangpur-3 and quit the other four, triggering by-elections in them. S. M. Hossain, of the Jatiya Party, was elected in a September 1991 by-election.

References

External links
 

Parliamentary constituencies in Bangladesh
Rangpur District